Sarıkaya or Haldeh is a village in the Midyat District of Mardin Province in Turkey. The village is populated by Arabs and had a population of 393 in 2021.

References 

Villages in Midyat District
Arab settlements in Mardin Province